La pena máxima may refer to:

 La pena máxima (2001 film), Colombian film
 La pena máxima, novel by Santiago Roncagliolo
 La pena máxima (2022 film), Peruvian film, based on the novel